Evans Center is a hamlet in the town of Evans in Erie County, New York, United States.  The Pioneer Cemetery was added to the National Register of Historic Places in 2012.

References

Hamlets in New York (state)
Hamlets in Erie County, New York